Yoshiaki "Fuji" Fujimori (born 1951) is a Japanese businessman. Between August 2011 and June 2016 he was the president and CEO of Lixil Group, a Japan headquartered manufacturer of building materials and housing equipment with net sales of $16.8bn, where he oversaw a globalization strategy that included the acquisition of global interests including Permasteelisa, American Standard Brands and GROHE Group. Under his leadership, Lixil expanded its ratio of sales from outside of Japan from 3% in 2010 to 30.3% in 2016.

Early life
Fuji was born and raised in Tokyo, Japan. He earned a bachelor's degree in petroleum engineering from the University of Tokyo and an MBA from Carnegie Mellon University, where he serves on the board of trustees since 2004.

Career 
Prior to Lixil, Fujimori spent 25 years at General Electric Company, where he held various posts including chairman of GE Japan (2009-2011), senior vice president of GE Money (2005-2009), CEO of GE Asia (2003-2005), CEO of GE Plastics (2001-2003), senior vice president of GE Healthcare Asia (1997-2001), as well as serving as a member of the corporate executive council. He started his career at Japanese trading company, Nisho Iwai Corporation (now Sojitz).

Fuji served as an external director of Tokyo Electric Power Company for over ten years. He is a senior executive advisor to CVC Capital Partners, and serves on the boards of Takeda Pharmaceutical Company., Boston Scientific, Shiseido, Toshiba Corporation and Oracle Corporation Japan.

References

1951 births
Living people
Japanese chief executives
University of Tokyo alumni
Carnegie Mellon University alumni
General Electric people
Lixil Group people
Takeda Pharmaceutical Company people
Sojitz people
Tokyo Electric Power Company people
Toshiba people
Boston Scientific people
Oracle employees
People from Tokyo